The Wild Boar Hunt is a 1618-1620 oil on oak panel painting by Peter Paul Rubens, now in the Gemäldegalerie Alte Meister in Dresden.

Related subjects by Rubens

References

1620 paintings
Paintings by Peter Paul Rubens
Collections of the Gemäldegalerie Alte Meister
Hunting in art